Dan or DAN may refer to:

People
 Dan (name), including a list of people with the name
 Dan (king), several kings of Denmark
 Dan people, an ethnic group located in West Africa
Dan language, a Mande language spoken primarily in Côte d'Ivoire and Liberia
 Dan (son of Jacob), one of the 12 sons of Jacob/Israel in the Bible
Tribe of Dan, one of the 12 tribes of Israel descended from Dan
 Crown Prince Dan, prince of Yan in ancient China

Places
 Dan (ancient city), the biblical location also called Dan, and identified with Tel Dan
 Dan, Israel, a kibbutz
 Dan, subdistrict of Kap Choeng District, Thailand
 Dan, West Virginia, an unincorporated community in the United States
 Dan River (disambiguation)
 Danzhou, formerly Dan County, China
 Gush Dan, the metropolitan area of  Tel Aviv in Israel

Organizations
Dan-Air, a defunct airline in the United Kingdom
Dan Bus Company, a public transport company in Israel
Dan Hotels, a hotel chain in Israel
Defeat Autism Now! (DAN!), a defunct, controversial program of the Autism Research Institute
Direct Action Network (DAN), a confederation of anarchist and anti-authoritarian affinity groups, collectives, and organizations
Disabled People's Direct Action Network (DAN), a former disability rights campaign in the UK
Divers Alert Network (DAN), a non-profit organization for Scuba diving

Science
 daN (decanewton), unit of force—see newton
 DAN (protein), a family of tgf beta signaling protein inhibitors 
 Dorsal attention network (DAN), a sensory orienting system in the brain
 Dynamic Albedo of Neutrons (DAN), a scientific instrument on board the Curiosity rover

Other
 Dan, a 1914 film starring Lois Meredith
 Dan (Chinese opera), a female role in Chinese opera
 Dan (cuneiform), a cuneiform sign
 Dan (newspaper), a daily newspaper published in Montenegro 
 Dan (rank) in Japanese, Chinese and Korean martial arts, go, and shogi
 English corruption of the title Dominus
 Do Anything Now (DAN), a jailbreak for ChatGPT

See also
 Daniel (disambiguation)
 Danny (disambiguation)
 List of people named Dan, people with the given name Dan